Paintings in Yellow is the fourth studio album by German singer Sandra, released on 26 March 1990 by Virgin Records. It was commercially successful and spawned the single "Hiroshima".

Background and release
The album was recorded at A.R.T. Studios, Sandra and Michael Cretu's home studio in Ibiza, Spain. The material showcased more mature sound, departing from Sandra's previous, up-tempo dance songs in favour of a more reflective and sophisticated style. Much of the material, especially the five-part track "The Journey", foreshadowed the sound of Enigma, a new-age music project that Michael and Sandra were working on during the making of the album. Frank Peterson, who was the co-producer on the Enigma project, took up the role of co-writing some of the tracks on Paintings in Yellow.

The cover of Wishful Thinking's "Hiroshima" was released as the lead single in February 1990, becoming a top-five chart success in Germany and Switzerland. It was followed by two further singles in 1990, "(Life May Be) A Big Insanity" and the ballad "One More Night", which were moderately successful on the charts.

Paintings in Yellow became Sandra's highest-charting album in Germany at number four, in addition to a top-10 peak in Switzerland. The record has been certified gold in Germany and France, and platinum in Switzerland.

Critical reception
Music & Media described the album as "[w]ell balanced and seamlessly commercial" and commented that "Sandra's sensual voice is wrapped in a sea of breathy instrumentation", but concluded that "despite the undeniable commerciality of it all this is rather predictable."

Track listing

Personnel
Credits adapted from the liner notes of Paintings in Yellow.

 Sandra – vocals
 Michael Cretu – production, arrangements, performance, engineering
 Frank Peterson – arrangements, performance, engineering
 Tom Leonardt – all acoustic and electric guitars
 Mike Schmidt – art direction
 Stefan Langner – photography

Charts

Weekly charts

Year-end charts

Certifications

References

1990 albums
Albums produced by Michael Cretu
Sandra (singer) albums
Virgin Records albums